Two ships of the United States Navy have borne the name USS Seadragon, named in honor of the seadragon, a small fish more commonly called the dragonet.

United States Navy ship names